Paramegistidae is a family of mites in the order Mesostigmata.

Species
Paramegistidae contains four genera, with 21 recognized species:

 Genus Meristomegistus Kim & Klompen, 2002
 Meristomegistus vazquezus Kim & Klompen, 2002
 Genus Ophiomegistus Banks, 1914
 Ophiomegistus alainae Goff, 1980
 Ophiomegistus armouri Goff, 1979
 Ophiomegistus australicus (Womersely, 1958)
 Ophiomegistus blumi Domrow, 1984
 Ophiomegistus brennani Goff, 1980
 Ophiomegistus clelandi Womersley, 1958
 Ophiomegistus iriani Domrow, 1984
 Ophiomegistus joppae Domrow, 1984
 Ophiomegistus kaii Goff, 1979
 Ophiomegistus keithi Domrow, 1978
 Ophiomegistus luzonensis Banks, 1914
 Ophiomegistus maximus Goff, 1980
 Ophiomegistus nihi Goff, 1980
 Ophiomegistus novaguinea Goff, 1980
 Ophiomegistus radovskyi Goff, 1979
 Ophiomegistus samuelsoni Goff, 1979
 Ophiomegistus sarawakensis Goff, 1980
 Ophiomegistus spectabilis Klompen & Austin, 2007
 Genus Paramegistus Trägårdh, 1906
 Paramegistus confrater Trägårdh, 1906
 Genus Pseudomegistus Kethley, 1977
 Pseudomegistus australis (Banks, 1916)

References

Mesostigmata
Acari families